Anampses lennardi, the blue-and-yellow wrasse, 
is a fish found in the Eastern Indian Ocean.

Etymology
The fish is named in honor of Fynes Barrett-Lennard (1915–2008), an Australian landowner who collected many herpetological and ichthyological specimens for the Western Australia Museum.

References

lennardi
Fish described in 1959
Taxa named by Trevor D. Scott